Marc-André Bernier is a Canadian archaeologist who specializes in underwater archaeology. Described as the "Indiana Jones of the deep seas" by the Toronto Star, Bernier was born in Kapuskasing, Ontario, and educated at the University of Ottawa, from which he received a BA degree in Classical Studies and a MA degree in Greek Archaeology. He also received an Education degree from Université du Québec en Abitibi-Témiscamingue. He joined the Underwater Archaeology Team of Parks Canada in 1990 and, since 2008, has been its manager.

References

Canadian archaeologists
Living people
Year of birth missing (living people)
University of Ottawa alumni
People from Kapuskasing

Underwater archaeologists
Université du Québec en Abitibi-Témiscamingue alumni